To protect and to serve may refer to:

 "To Protect and to Serve", the motto of the Los Angeles Police Department since 1963, subsequently adopted by many other police forces
 A.D. Police: To Protect and Serve, a Japanese animated television series
 "To Protect and Serve" (The Twilight Zone), a Twilight Zone episode
 To Serve and Protect, a Canadian documentary television series
 "Serve & Protect", a Brooklyn Nine-Nine episode
 To Serve and Protect (book)
 "To Protect and Serve" (Only Murders in the Building), a 2021 episode of the TV series Only Murders in the Building